Prof Dr Shahnaz Fatmi (born Shahnaz Bano on 5 January 1949), is an Indian Hindi and Urdu language poet and writer. She used her takhallus (pen names) of Fatmi (Urdu: فاطمى; Hindi: फातमी). She is the daughter of Syed Sultan Ahmed (Behzad Fatmi) and is from Shekhpura Village, District Munger (Bihar), India. She was daughter of Urdu poet Syed Sultan Ahmed and grand-daughter of poet Khan Bahadur Syed Ali Mohammad Shad Azimabadi and worked as Deputy Collector for Bihar Civil Service.

Bibliography 
She has written poetry and novels in Hindi, Urdu and English. Few of the books are:
 Magar Sushma Nahi Tuti (Urdu & Hindi)
 Lipsa (Urdu & Hindi)
 Darakte Rishte (Urdu & Hindi)
 Lamhon Ki Kasak (Urdu & Hindi)
 Churail (J.T.S. Printers,Patna 2000)
 Chand (Urdu & Hindi)
 Bolti Aankhein (Urdu & Hindi)
 Kalaam-e-Shaad Azimabadi
 Har Singar Ke Saaye(Urdu & Hindi)
 Chiraag  e daama
 Directive Principles: An Appraisal (English)
 Din Jo Pakheru Hote (Upanayas) (Hindi, 2018)
 Sushma (Hindi & Urdu)
 Ka Se Kahun (Hindi) (Abhishek Prakashan), New Delhi, 2020

Translations
 Wahi Ki Hasya Vayang Rachnaye (J.T.S Printers), Patna, 1993
 Taraksha-e-Wahi (J.T.S Printers), Patna, 1995
 Bayaz-e-Behzad (J.T.S Printers), Patna, 1996
 Kalam-e-Shad (J.T.S Printers), Patna, 1997
 Aqqaye Dushyan (J.T.S Printers), Patna, 1998

Recoginition and awards 

 Ayyaam – Voice of Women on Literature
 Shahnaz Fatmi remember Acharya Shivpujan Sahay at a function at Arvind Mahila College in Patna
 Shahnaz Fatmi remember Shad Azimabadi on his 90th Death Anniversary in Patna
 Shahnaz Fatmi in Indian language-literature meet in Patna
 Shahnaz Fatmi in Ayaam – A women's literary organization

See also
 List of Indian poets
 List of Indian writers
 List of women writers

References

External links 
 http://www.urducouncil.nic.in/schemes/sanctionOrders/pdf/BPSO-08-09-16.pdf
 
 http://bolozindagi.com/tag/dr-shahnaz-fatmi/
 http://www.hindibook.com/index.php?p=sr&Uc=HB-411196
 http://www.hindibook.com/index.php?p=sr&Field=author&String=SHAHNAZ%20FATMI
 https://ompublications.in/product/books/OM31607
 https://www.ibpbooks.com/din-jo-pakheru-hote-upanayas/p/32934
 http://www.dkagencies.com/doc/from/1023/to/21430/LCSH/Urdu%20fiction/LCSubjectHeading.html
 http://www.unesco.org/xtrans/bsresult.aspx?lg=0&c=IND&fr=8550

Poets from Bihar
Hindustani-language writers
Living people
21st-century Indian Muslims
Urdu-language poets from India
Hindi-language writers
Linguists of Hindi
1949 births
Indian women poets
20th-century Indian poets
21st-century Indian poets
People from Munger district
Indian Marxist poets
20th-century Indian women writers
21st-century Indian women writers
21st-century Indian writers